The Polish Academy Audience Award is an annual award given by audience to the best Polish film of the year.

Winners

External links
 Polish Film Awards; Official website 

Polish film awards
Awards established in 2002